Tampereen Isku-Volley is a volleyball team from Finland. It is based in Tampere. The team was founded in 1911, originally known as Rantaperkiön Isku, the name changed to Tampereen Isku-Volley at the beginning of the 1990s.

Achievements 

 6 Finland Champion
 8 Finland league silver
 6 Finland league bronze
 3 Finland Cup champion

History 

Isku-Volley is the Finnish volleyball league's oldest team. It has played in the league over thirteen year. The team has participated in over nine hundred matches, the biggest reading of Finnish teams ever. The club has six Finland Championships, eight silver, and six bronze medal. Finland Cup team has won third times. Last Finland league Champion was the 2005-2006 season.

Team

Season 2008-2009 

Setters:

 3.  Chris Tamas
 5.  Ossi Heino

Middle-blockerst:

 2.  Anssi Vesanen
 4.  Ossi Vesanen
 8.  Sauli Sinkkonen
 13.  Sauli Silpo

Wing-spikers:

 6.  Tuomas Tihinen
 14.  Joni Mikkonen

Opposite:

  Ryan Jay Owens
Libero:

 2.  Tapio Kangasniemi

Famous players 

 Sami Juvonen
 Mika Pyrhönen
 Matti Ollikainen
 Tapio Kangasniemi
 Jussi Heino
 Tuomas Tihinen
 Anssi Vesanen
 Kenneth Aro

Finnish volleyball clubs
Sport in Tampere